Tolmomyias is a genus of Neotropical birds in the tyrant flycatcher family Tyrannidae. It is one of the two genera containing the "flatbills"; the other is Rhynchocyclus.

The genus was erected by the Austrian ornithologist Carl Eduard Hellmayr in 1927 with the yellow-olive flatbill (Tolmomyias sulphurescens) as the type species. The genus name Tolmomyias combines the Ancient Greek  "courage" or "boldness" with the New Latin   "flycatcher".

These species are notoriously difficult to identify, except by voice. Their taxonomy is complex and it is likely that some "species" actually include several species level taxa. They are relatively thickset birds with proportionally large heads and, as suggested by their name, flat bills. All have a primarily yellow-green plumage with distinct edging to the wings, and the crown is often grey. They are usually found in humid forests where they forage well above the forest floor and will join mixed flocks. Their bag-shaped nests are often placed near wasp nests.

Species
The genus contains seven species:

Notes

References

 
Bird genera
Taxonomy articles created by Polbot